Igor Gaydamaka (sometimes shown as Igor Gaidaymaka) is a Soviet sprint canoer who competed in the early 1980s. He won four medals at the ICF Canoe Sprint World Championships with two golds (K-4 500 m: 1981, 1982) and two silvers (K-4 500 m: 1985, K-4 1000 m: 1985).

References

Living people
Soviet male canoeists
Year of birth missing (living people)
Russian male canoeists
ICF Canoe Sprint World Championships medalists in kayak